Tru Skool (born Sukhjit Singh OLK) is a Derby Midlands, UK based Punjabi bhangra, hip hop, record producer. He was awarded multiple Brit Asia TV Music Awards. His produced albums "Back to Basics" by Diljit Dosanjh and "Bacthafucup" by Karan Aujla were charted on Billboard Top Canadian Albums.

He is known for using a variety of Punjabi folk instruments along with traditional Hip-Hop beats. He usually plays all instruments such as Dhol, Tabla, Harmonium, Drums in his songs by himself. Also he is recognized as one of finest producers in Punjabi music known for his originality and immense music quality.

Career
In 2004, Tru-Skool started his career with the Word Is Born which was collaborated with Mandeep Singh Marwah known as The Specialist. After this, he produced his second album Repazent again with The Specialist. 
He has worked with [Diljit Dosanjh] for [Back 2 Basics (Diljit Dosanjh album)|Back 2 Basics] (2012). Later he worked with JK, Kulvinder Singh Johal and many more.

In 2013 he was awarded for Best Asian Music Producer at the [Brit Asia TV Music Awards]. In 2017 he was awarded both Best Album for One Time 4 Ya Mind and Best Music Producer.

In 2021, Karan Aujla's album " BacTHAfucUP" produced by him appeared on #19 Billboard Top Canadian Albums.

Solo discography

Religious discography

Discography as a producer

Film projects

Single tracks

References

External links
Official Facebook Page

Year of birth missing (living people)
Living people
British male singer-songwriters